Daniel Klein (1609–1666) was a Lutheran pastor and scholar from Tilsit, Duchy of Prussia, who is best known for writing the first grammar book of the Lithuanian language.

Klein studied philosophy, theology, Greek and Hebrew in the University of Königsberg. In 1637 he became a Lutheran pastor.

In 1653 Klein published the first printed grammar book of the Lithuanian language – Grammatica Litvanica, written in Latin. Klein coined the distinctive Lithuanian letter Ė. He also wrote a Lithuanian dictionary, but it was left unpublished.

Klein published collections of Lithuanian hymns, some of which he wrote himself.

Another German, as well an Evangelical Lutheran priest, and an appreciator of the Lithuanian language, who wrote a grammar of the Lithuanian language in German language, Gottfried Ostermeyer, in the 1793 book described Daniel Klein as follows:

References

External links 
 Danielius Kleinas, Daiva Kšanienė, Mažoji Lietuva 
 The Lithuanian Language, Giedrius Subačius, Institute of the Lithuanian Language

Balticists
1609 births
1666 deaths
People from Tilsit
Linguists from Germany
17th-century German Lutheran clergy
Grammarians from Germany
History of the Lithuanian language
Lithuanian grammar
Linguists from Lithuania
Lutheran hymnwriters
People from the Duchy of Prussia
Linguists of Lithuanian
University of Königsberg alumni
17th-century hymnwriters